The 2023 All-Ireland Senior Football Championship is the 136th edition of the Gaelic Athletic Association's premier inter-county Gaelic football tournament since its establishment in 1887.

Thirty one of the thirty two Irish counties take part – Kilkenny will not compete, while London and New York complete the lineup.

The championship will work as a two-tier system for the second time, with the Tailteann Cup being the second tier competition for those that do not qualify for the Sam Maguire Cup competition.

Kerry are the defending champions.

The draws for the provincial championships took place on 15 October 2022.

The All-Ireland final is due to be played on 30 July 2023 at Croke Park in Dublin.

Competition format

Provincial Championships format
Connacht, Leinster, Munster and Ulster each organise a provincial championship. All provincial matches are knock-out.

All-Ireland Championship round-robin
Sixteen teams progress to the All-Ireland Championship round-robin:
The 4 provincial champions
The 4 beaten provincial finalists
The 2022 Tailteann Cup winners
The 7 next-ranked teams, based on final position in the 2023 National Football League 
Position is based on standing after promotion and relegation are applied and after finals are played; therefore, the top two teams in Division 2 outrank the bottom two teams in Division 1, and if the 2nd placed team in Division 2 wins the final, they are ranked above the 1st place finishers who lost the final.
If Westmeath reach the Leinster final, then an 8th team will be chosen based on league position.

The other 17 county teams compete in the 2023 Tailteann Cup.

In the All-Ireland Championship round-robin, 16 teams are drawn into four groups of four teams. Each team plays the other teams in its group once, earning 2 points for a win and 1 for a draw. Each team plays one home, one away and one neutral fixture.

The top three in each group advance to the knockout stages; first-place teams to the All-Ireland quarter-finals, and second- and third-placed teams to the preliminary quarter-finals.

All-Ireland format
The four second-placed teams play against the third-placed teams in the preliminary quarter-finals. The winners of the preliminary quarter-finals advance to play the group winners in the All-Ireland quarter-finals. Two semi-finals and a final follow. All matches are knock-out.

Provincial championships

Connacht Senior Football Championship

Quarter-finals

Semi-finals

Final

Leinster Senior Football Championship

Preliminary round

Quarter-finals

Semi-finals

Final

Munster Senior Football Championship

Quarter-finals

Semi-finals

Final

Ulster Senior Football Championship

Preliminary round

Quarter-finals

Semi-finals

Final

All-Ireland group stage

Format 
16 teams will be divided into 4 groups of 4 teams and will play a round robin to qualify into the knockout stage of the All-Ireland.

Teams qualified for group stage:
  Galway (guaranteed a top six finish in NFL)
  Mayo (guaranteed a top two finish in NFL)
  Westmeath (Tailteann Cup holders)

League ranking

Group A 

Played or the weekend May 20th & 21st or 27th & 28th.

Group B 

Played on the weekend of June 3rd & 4th.

Group C 

Played on the weekend of June 17th & 18th.

Group D

All-Ireland knockout stage

Preliminary Quarter-finals

All-Ireland Quarter-finals

All-Ireland semi-finals 

If Provincial champions qualify Connacht will face Munster, Leinster will face Ulster in the other.

All-Ireland final

Stadia and locations.

Notes

References

External links
GAA official website

All-Ireland Senior Football Championship